Al-Shatibi is an Arabic name indicating an origin in Xàtiva (Spain). It may refer to:

Abu Ishaq al-Shatibi (1320–1388), Andalusian scholar of Maliki  (Islamic jurisprudence)